The 1994 Tour de France was the 81st edition of Tour de France, one of cycling's Grand Tours. The Tour began in Lille with a prologue individual time trial on 2 July and Stage 10 occurred on 12 July with a flat stage to Cahors. The race finished on the Champs-Élysées in Paris on 24 July.

Prologue
2 July 1994 — Lille to Lille,  (individual time trial)

Stage 1
3 July 1994 — Lille to Armentières,

Stage 2
4 July 1994 — Roubaix to Boulogne-sur-Mer,

Stage 3
5 July 1994 — Calais to Eurotunnel,  (team time trial)

Stage 4
6 July 1994 — Dover (Great Britain) to Brighton (Great Britain),

Stage 5
7 July 1994 — Portsmouth (Great Britain) to Portsmouth (Great Britain),

Stage 6
8 July 1994 — Cherbourg-en-Cotentin to Rennes,

Stage 7
9 July 1994 — Rennes to Futuroscope,

Stage 8
10 July 1994 — Poitiers to Trélissac,

Stage 9
11 July 1994 — Périgueux to Bergerac,  (individual time trial)

Stage 10
12 July 1994 — Bergerac to Cahors,

References

1994 Tour de France
Tour de France stages